NICI or NICI AG is the name of a German toy factory based in Altenkunstadt in the north Bavarian region of Upper Franconia. The company was founded in 1986, and produces plush toys, stationery, figurines, greeting cards, pillows, water bottles, magnets, and other merchandise. NICI produced Goleo, the mascot of the 2006 FIFA World Cup.

The company filed for bankruptcy in May 2006. In December of that year the firm was taken over by a fund controlled by the Strategic Value Partners Group.

Operations

NICI has approximately 400 employees. It operates 30 gift shops in Germany and six gift shops in Asia. It maintains distribution partners in over 50 countries.

Created characters

 Ayumi Be You
 Woody Wulf
 Meerkat
 Four all toothies: Arthur Rat, Timothy the hamster, Thelma Squirrel and Theo Beaver
 Jolly Mah sheep & Jolly Wolf
 Verano Caliente parrots & toucan
 Jack & Jill Huskies
 Unicorns of Magical Forest
 Snow Rabbit & Reindeer
 Camel & Ant
 Calvin the Skunk
 Polar Bear & Winter Bear
 Frog & Turtle
 Sam the Eagle
 Creatures of the Jungle, such as tiger, giraffe, leopard, crocodile, etc.
 Edward the Horse & his Landlord farm friends
 Devil & Angel
 Random everyday animals such as dogs, cats and bears
 Max the Elephant & Milly the Mouse
 Simsalabeans for Halloween
 The Love Dog
 Mona & Lou the loving monkeys
 Mini Little Wingel angels
 Spunky and sassy cats
 A perky fox
 Seafriends
 Magic meadow fairies dressed up as bugs
 Seal
 Valentine monkeys
 Valentino & Valentina the Love Bears
 Paula Duck
 Wild Pete Piglet
 Bud Badger
 Silvio Raven
 Lillebi (created by Steinbeck)
 NICI Wonderland
 Monsters

References

External links

 Official website
 Official website of the mobile division

Toy companies of Germany
2006 disestablishments in Germany
Toy companies established in 1986 
German companies established in 1986
2006 mergers and acquisitions